The Ministry of Health (MoH) is the government ministry of Ghana that is responsible for the health of Ghanaians.  It is involved in providing public health services, managing Ghana's healthcare industry, and building Ghana's hospitals and medical education system.

Ministry main offices are located in Accra.

The ministry is responsible for all health related issues in Ghana. It was responsible for direct public health service delivery or provision in the country. However, with the enactment of an ACT 525 of parliament, the functions of promotion, preventive, curative and rehabilitative care has been delegated to the Ghana Health Service and Teaching hospitals. Hence, the ministry is now responsible for only policy formulation, monitoring and evaluation, resource mobilization and regulation of the health service delivery in the country.

Agencies
Ministry agencies include:
Ghana Medical and Dental Council
Pharmacy Council Ghana
Ghana Registered Nurses and Midwives
Alternative Medicine Council
Foods and Drug Authority
Private Hospitals and Maternity Homes Board
National Health Insurance Authority
Ghana National Drugs Programme
Ghana Health Service
Allied Health Professions Council
Occupational Therapy Association Of Ghana
Ghana National Ambulance Service

Personnel 
Victor Asare Bampoe - Deputy Minister (2014 –2017)

Bernard Okoe-Boye - Deputy Minister (2020 –2021)

See also
List of Hospitals in Ghana
Minister for Health (Ghana)
Health in Ghana

References

External links
 Ministry of Health
 Ministry of Health at Ministries section of Ghana.gov.gh
 Ghana Health Service, an MoH agency
 Ghana Registered Nurses and Midwives, an MoH agency
 Ghana National Drugs Programme, an MoH agency
 Christian Health Association of Ghana, an MoH partner

Health
Medical and health organisations based in Ghana
Ghana
Accra